Thomas More Catholic School is a Roman Catholic secondary school and sixth form, located in the Purley area of the London Borough of Croydon, England. The Margaret Roper Primary School is located adjacent to Thomas More Catholic School.

The school was established in 1962 in buildings formerly used as an orphanage. It is a voluntary aided school, under the direction of the Roman Catholic Archdiocese of Southwark and Croydon London Borough Council. The school has also been awarded the International School Award, since 2008.

Thomas More Catholic School offers GCSEs and BTECs as programmes of study for pupils, whilst sixth form students can choose to study from a range of A Levels and BTEC Nationals.

References

External links 

Secondary schools in the London Borough of Croydon
Catholic secondary schools in the Archdiocese of Southwark
Educational institutions established in 1962
1962 establishments in England
Voluntary aided schools in London